Government College Ground Mirpur is a multi-purpose ground in Mirpur Azad Kashmir, Pakistan. It is the home of the Pilot Football Club & Youth Football Club.

Football venues in Pakistan